The following lists events that happened during 2009 in the Grand Duchy of Luxembourg.

Incumbents

Events

January – March
 8 February – Fabienne Gaul replaces Marie-Thérèse Gantenbein-Koullen in the Chamber of Deputies, after Gantenbein-Koullen retires.
 11 March – Patrick Santer resigns from the Chamber of Deputies.
 12 March – After the confrontation of December 2008 over euthanasia, the constitution of Luxembourg is amended to change the Grand Duke's power as from 'promulgating' law to 'sanctioning' law: removing his veto.
 13 March - Luxembourg announces that it will provide details of private bank clients to foreign tax authorities if 'concrete proof' of tax evasion is provided.
 17 March – Following the constitutional amendment, the Chamber of Deputies votes 30–26 to legalise euthanasia.  The Grand Duke refuses to sign the law, but no longer has the power to veto it.
 17 March – Raymond Weydert replaces Patrick Santer in the Chamber of Deputies.

April – June
 1 April – Luxembourg legalises euthanasia.
 2 April – Luxembourg is included on a G-20 'grey list' of tax havens.
 21 April – Jean-Claude Juncker delivers his fifteenth State of the Nation address.
 27 April – Patrick Santer is appointed to the Council of State, replacing Victor Rod, who resigned on 7 March.
 26 April – Andy Schleck wins the Liège–Bastogne–Liège in Belgium, marking the first victory of the classic by a cyclist from Luxembourg in 55 years.
 12 May - Arcelor Mittal's annual general meeting is marked by a rioting by up to 1,000 steel-workers, bused in from Belgium and France, in Place des Martyrs.
 20 May - Luxembourg and the United States sign a tax treaty, pledging to exchange private bank client details upon request: the first Luxembourg has signed with an OECD country.
 24 May – The 2008-09 season of the  National Division finishes, with F91 Dudelange winning the title for a fifth successive season.
 30 May – F91 Dudelange win the Luxembourg Cup, beating UN Käerjéng 97 5–0 in the final to complete the Double for the third time.
 2 June - Luxembourg reports its first case of swine influenza in the ongoing pandemic.
 7 June – Elections are held to the Chamber of Deputies and to the European Parliament.  The CSV wins 26 seats of 60 in the Chamber and 3 of 6 in the European Parliament, strengthening its dominance.
 7 June – Fränk Schleck wins the 2009 Tour de Luxembourg, with Team Saxo Bank picking up the team title.  He is the first Luxembourger to win since 1983.
 22 June - A protest by European milk farmers outside a Council of the European Union meeting in Luxembourg City ends in rioting.

July – September
 23 July - The CSV and LSAP conclude a coalition agreement, forming a new government under Jean-Claude Juncker and Jean Asselborn.
 26 July - The 2009 Tour de France concludes, with Luxembourger Andy Schleck in second place and his older brother Fränk in sixth.
 28 July - Laurent Mosar is elected the new President of the Chamber, replacing Lucien Weiler.

October – December
 11 November – Erna Hennicot-Schoepges is appointed to the Council of State, replacing Nico Edon, who resigned on 1 November.
 17 November – Georges Schroeder is appointed as President of the Council of State, replacing Alain Meyer.

Deaths
 11 February - Yvonne Useldinger, politician and resistance leader

Footnotes

 
Luxembourg